Georg Flegel (1566 – 23 March 1638) was a German painter, best known for his still-life works.

Biography

Flegel was born in Olmütz (Olomouc), Moravia. Around 1580 he moved to Vienna, where he became an assistant to Lucas van Valckenborch I, a painter and draughtsman. Flegel and his employer later moved to Frankfurt, which at the time was an important art-dealing city. As an assistant, he inserted items such as fruit, flowers, and table utensils into Valckenborch's works.

He is probably the same person Kramm found in Utrecht as ‘juriaen vlegel, Constschilder.’ in the "Protokol" of the notary (or real estate agent) Verduyn, noted as "Acte van 21 Maart, 1616". If so, then he probably moved there because of the new Utrecht Guild of St. Luke and probably knew other still-life painters active there in that period, such as Roelandt Savery (who had made a trip to Tyrol) and Balthasar van der Ast.

According to the RKD he was pupil of Lucas van Valckenborch in Linz during 1582–1592.
In a period of about 30 years (c. 1600–1630), he produced 110 watercolor and oil pictures, mostly still-life images which often depicted tables set for meals and covered with food, flowers and the occasional animal. Among his students were his own two sons, Friedrich (1596/1597–1616) and Jacob (probably Leonhard, 1602–1623), as well as the flower artist Jacob Marrel.

Flegel died in 1638 in Frankfurt-am-Main.

External links

See also
 List of German painters

References 

 Anne-Dore Ketelsen-Volkhardt: Georg Flegel. 1566 - 1638. Deutscher Kunstverlag, München/Berlin 2003, 
 Kurt Wettengl: Georg Flegel (1566 - 1638), Stilleben : [Publikation zur Ausstellung "Georg Flegel (1566 - 1638), Stilleben" des Historischen Museums Frankfurt am Main in Zusammenarbeit mit der Schirn Kunsthalle Frankfurt vom 18. Dezember bis 13. Februar 1994]. Hatje, Stuttgart 1993, 
 Parrots in still life painting (in German)

 Georg Flegel on Artnet
 Georg Flegel in Slovak National Gallery

1566 births
1638 deaths
16th-century German painters
German male painters
17th-century German painters
Moravian-German people
Artists from Olomouc
German still life painters
Flower artists